The 2019 European Short Track Speed Skating Championships took place, for the fourth time, from 11 to 13 January 2019 in Dordrecht, Netherlands.

Medal summary

Medal table

Men's events

The results of the Championships:

Women's events

The results of the Championships:

Participating nations 

  (2)
  (6)
  (1)
  (8)
  (3)
  (6)
  (6)
  (9)
  (7)
  (6)
  (9)
  (2)
  (1)
  (9)
  (4)
  (1)
  (10)
  (9)
  (10)
  (1)
  (1)
  (2)
  (4)
  (8)

See also
Short track speed skating
European Short Track Speed Skating Championships

References

External links
 Official website
Official protocol

European Short Track Speed Skating Championships
European Short Track Speed Skating Championships
European Short Track Speed Skating Championships
International speed skating competitions hosted by the Netherlands
European Short Track Championships
Sports competitions in Dordrecht